The women's 200 metres at the 2022 World Athletics U20 Championships was held at the Estadio Olímpico Pascual Guerrero in Cali, Colombia on 4 and 5 August 2022.

Records
U20 standing records prior to the 2022 World Athletics U20 Championships were as follows:

Results

Round 1
Qualification: First 3 of each heat (Q) and the 6 fastest times (q) qualified for the semifinals.

Semifinals
Qualification: First 2 of each heat (Q) and the 2 fastest times (q) qualified for the final.

Final
The final was held on 3 August at 20:41

References

200 metres women
200 metres at the World Athletics U20 Championships